Nine Partners Patent may refer to:

 The Great Nine Partners Patent (1697), land grant in Dutchess County, New York, USA
 The Little Nine Partners Patent (1706), land grant in Dutchess County, New York, USA